Sugar Daddies is a silent comedy short film starring Jimmy Finlayson, Stan Laurel and Oliver Hardy prior to their official billing as the duo Laurel and Hardy. The team appeared in a total of 107 films between 1921 and 1951.

Plot
A rich oil tycoon (Finlayson) awakens one morning after a night of carousing to be told that he was married the night before. Not only does he have a new wife, but also a new gold-digging stepdaughter and brother-in-law who want to murder him for his wealth. His lawyer (Laurel) is called in to straighten things out when a blackmail attempt is made. He decides to hide out in a hotel with his butler (Hardy) and his lawyer (Laurel). He finally escapes by climbing on Stan's shoulders, wearing a long overcoat and pretending to be Ollie's wife. Wild chases through a dance hall and amusement park ensue.

Cast

References

External links

1927 films
1927 comedy films
American silent short films
American black-and-white films
Films directed by Fred Guiol
Films directed by Leo McCarey
Films set in amusement parks
Laurel and Hardy (film series)
Films with screenplays by H. M. Walker
1927 short films
American comedy short films
1920s American films
Silent American comedy films